Friedrich Wilhelm August Ludwig Kiepert, German mathematician
Heinrich Kiepert, German Geographer
Richard Kiepert, German cartographer